José Manuel Oneto Revuelta (14 March 1942 – 7 October 2019), better known as Pepe Oneto,  was a Spanish journalist and writer; he has been described as one of the greatest journalists during the Spanish transition to democracy.

Biography
Oneto was born in the Andalusian city of San Fernando, Cádiz, on 14 March 1942. He got a degree in Economics and a diploma in Journalism. His professional career began in Diario Madrid in 1961, an anti-Francoist newspaper until its closure in 1971 by the regime.

During the Transition he joined the agencies Agence France-Presse and Colpisa. Through letters, he wrote his political chronicles, which were published by fifteen newspapers, including La Vanguardia. At that time, he worked with the French writer and journalist Jacques Kaufmann who was then a foreign correspondent in Madrid and conducted the first interview of the newly installed King Juan Carlos I.

In 1974 he joined the staff of the magazine Cambio 16, becoming its director in 1976. The political magazine at that time became one of the bastions of the informative opening that occurred during the transition, reaching half a million copies. Later he would also be appointed General Director of Publications of Group 16.

In 1986 he joined the Zeta Group, going on to run the magazine Tiempo, until 1996. During that time the publication became one of the most widely published among political content magazines.

He was also Director of Informational at Antena 3 Televisión between 1996 and 1998. In 2000, and again in 2016, he was appointed member of the Board of Directors of Telemadrid.

As a political commentator, he was a regular in the current-affairs gatherings on both radio and on television, having collaborated in the spaces Day by day (1996–2004) and La Mirada Crítica (1999–2002), in Telecinco, Hermida y Cía (1993–1996), Hour H (1996–1997), The first coffee (1996–1998), Every day (2004–2005), Ruedo Ibérico (2004–2006) and Public Mirror (2006–) in Antena 3, Night in 24 hours (2015–2018) on TVE, 4 Herrera on the Wave (2004–2015), More than one (since 2015) and The Compass on Wave Zero.

Death
He died on 7 October 2019 in a hospital in San Sebastián, in Spain's Basque Country, at the age of 77 after entering in August due to peritonitis, which eventually degenerated into sepsis. His death was lamented by journalism and politics of Spain. Prime Minister Pedro Sánchez described him as a "leading journalist".

Books
  Arias between two crises 1973-1975, 1975
  One hundred days in the death of Francisco Franco, 1975
  José María de Areilza, 1977
  The last days of a President: from resignation to the coup d'etat, 1981
  The Night of Tejero, 1981
  Where is Felipe going?, 1983
  Madrid Command, 1984
  The Kidnapping of Change, 1984
  Anatomy of a regime change, 1985
  The truth about the Tejero case: the process of the century, 1985
  Twenty years that changed Spain, 1999
  One hundred days that changed Spain, 2005
  23 -F. The untold story, 2006

Awards
 Agustín Merello Award 2010.
 National Journalism Award of Spain.
 Golden Antenna of Television.
 I Santiago Castelo Award for the Journalistic Trajectory.

References

1942 births
2019 deaths
People from San Fernando, Cádiz
Spanish journalists
Spanish writers
Writers from Andalusia
Deaths from appendicitis
Spanish transition to democracy